Anne 'Annie' Veronica Goldson  is a New Zealand journalism and film academic specialising in documentaries. Her films include Punitive Damage, Georgie Girl, Brother Number One and Kim Dotcom: Caught in the Web.

Career
Goldson has a BSc from Otago University, a Diploma in Journalism from Canterbury University, a Master of Arts from New York University and a PhD from the University of Auckland. The title of her doctoral thesis was A claim to truth: documentary, politics, production. She is currently a professor at of Media and Communication at the University of Auckland.

Honours and recognition 
Goldson was made an Officer of the New Zealand Order of Merit in 2007 for services to film and was elected a Fellow of the Royal Society of New Zealand in 2007. She was awarded the Humanities Aronui Medal by Royal Society Te Apārangi in 2021.

Selected works 
 Goldson, A. (12/3/2017). Kim Dotcom: Caught in the Web, South by South West Festival, Austin, Texas (premiere).  
Goldson, A. (2015). Journalism plus?: The resurgence of creative documentary. Pacific Journalism Review, 21 (2), 86–98. 
 King, B., Goldson, A. V., & Robie, D. (Eds.) (2015). Documentary practice in the Asia-Pacific. Auckland: Pacific Media Centre. Pages: 217. 
 Goldson, A. V. (2014). Testimony and Translation: Tracing the Past in Brother Number One. Studies in Documentary Film, 8 (1), 2–20. 10.1080/17503280.2014.900709

References

External links
 
 Women make movies 
 Institutional homepage

Living people
New Zealand women academics
New Zealand film directors
New Zealand film producers
University of Otago alumni
University of Canterbury alumni
Academic staff of the University of Auckland
University of Auckland alumni
Officers of the New Zealand Order of Merit
Year of birth missing (living people)
New Zealand journalists
New Zealand women writers
New Zealand women film producers